is an arcade racing video game developed by Sega AM2 and released by Sega in 1994. Players race stock cars on one of three courses. The first game released on the Sega Model 2 three-dimensional arcade system board, a prototype debuted at Tokyo's Amusement Machine Show in August 1993 and was location tested in Japan the same month, before the complete game released in March 1994. Daytona USA is one of the highest-grossing arcade games of all time.

Inspired by the popularity of the NASCAR motor racing series in the U.S., Daytona USA was developed by AM2 after a meeting of the heads of Sega's regional offices for a game to debut the Model 2 hardware. The concept was suggested by Tom Petit, president of Sega's American arcade division, with input from AM2 director Toshihiro Nagoshi, who became the game's director and producer. Sega aimed to outperform Namco's Ridge Racer (1993). The developers researched motorsports extensively; they used satellite imagery and photography to map the Daytona International Speedway, and their experience developing Virtua Racing (1992) helped with lighting and camera control. Visual effects include texture filtering and texture mapping, a 60-frames-per second frame rate, and four different camera perspectives.

Daytona USA was a critical and commercial success, praised for its graphics, soundtrack and realism. A conversion was made on the Sega Saturn home console in 1995, and followed by sequels and enhancements for consoles and arcades. It was influential on the racing genre, and has been frequently named one of the best video games of all time.

Gameplay

In Daytona USA, the player drives a stock car known as the Hornet. The player's objectives are to outrun the competing cars and complete the race before time runs out, passing checkpoints to collect more time.  Players begin in last place and compete against a field of up to 39 computer-controlled cars, dependent on the course selected. Three courses are available for play: Beginner, Advanced, and Expert, also known respectively as Three Seven Speedway, Dinosaur Canyon, and Seaside Street Galaxy. Adaptive difficulty is used; the first lap of each race measures the skill of the player and adjust the difficulty of opponents accordingly. For less skilled players, opposing cars open lanes for the player, while higher skilled players have to deal with opponents that block their path. Additionally the game's physics include realistic driving mechanics, including drifting and power sliding. The steering wheel in the arcade cabinet utlilizes force feedback so players feel collisions and bumps.

Daytona USA's arcade version on the Model 2 is capable of displaying up to 300,000 texture-mapped polygons per second, nearly double that of the previous Model 1. Visually, the game runs at 60 frames per second and utilizes texture filtering, giving the visuals a smooth appearance. The game's camera system presents four different view perspectives from which the game can be played, similar to Virtua Racing, and also includes the ability to view behind the car. The arcade version offers multiplayer and up to eight players can compete depending on the number of cabinets linked together. Linked deluxe cabinets may also include a camera pointing towards the drivers seat, linked to a closed-circuit television to show the player on a separate screen.  In multiplayer, only the lead driver needs to reach a checkpoint before time runs out. To keep players involved in multiplayer battles, rubber-banding is in place, ensuring all players stay involved in the race.

The Sega Saturn version does not include multiplayer, but includes an additional "Saturn" mode, which turns off the game's timer and adds more cars from which the player can select. Additional "Endurance" and "Grand Prix" modes are also included, both of which require pit stops. Sustaining damage in a race in these modes will adversely affect the car's performance. The PlayStation 3 and Xbox 360 versions included online multiplayer with up to eight players.

Development
In September 1992, Sega partnered with the engineering group GE Aerospace to create its new arcade system board, the Model 2. The heads of Sega's regional offices began discussing ideas for games to demonstrate the Model 2's capabilities. Sega's previous board, the Model 1, had debuted in 1992 with Virtua Racing, which was popular in Japan and Europe. Tom Petit, president of Sega's American arcade division Sega Enterprises USA, suggested that NASCAR would be an attractive brand to use for a Model 2 game in the US. Though Sega Europe's Vic Leslie had reservations due to the greater popularity of Formula One in Europe, Sega executives approved the concept. In the US for a meeting on the Model 2, director and producer Toshihiro Nagoshi was given tickets to a NASCAR race, and recalled how it was a new experience for him because it was not a known style of racing in Japan.

Petit and Sega Enterprises USA chief of finance Masahiro Nakagawa began negotiations with representatives of the Daytona 500 at Daytona International Speedway for a license. To lower costs, Sega decided not to negotiate with NASCAR for a license, and so the game does not contain real sponsors, drivers, or cars. Development was handed to Sega AM2, a development division headed by Yu Suzuki, who had led development on popular racing games including Hang-On, Out Run, and Virtua Racing. Suzuki served as producer on Daytona USA alongside Nagoshi.

Sega mandated that Daytona USA had to be better than Namco's 1993 racing game Ridge Racer. Whereas Ridge Racer focused on simulation, Daytona USA instead aimed for "funky entertainment". AM2 split into two teams: one focused on Daytona USA while the other developed Virtua Fighter. Nagoshi read books and watched videos on NASCAR, although he found it difficult to convey the emotions of the sport to his staff in Japan. Game planner Makoto Osaki said he purchased a sports car and watched the NASCAR film Days of Thunder more than 100 times. Programmer Daichi Katagiri was an avid player of arcade racing games at the time and leaned on that experience.

The developers used satellite imagery and sent staff to photograph Daytona International Speedway; Nagoshi walked a full lap to get a feel for the banking in the corners. The team also considered Daytona International Speedway and Bristol Motor Speedway for the game's beginner course. According to Nagoshi, because Daytona USA was not intended to be a simulation game, and because it would be sold in Japan and Europe in addition to North America, the oval and tri-oval designs were rejected as too repetitive. The final design for the beginner circuit, Three Seven Speedway, used the tri-oval layout with a sharper final turn that requires strong braking.

Katagiri said there was no need to develop software for rendering because the Model 2 hardware handled this. The team had difficulty with texture mapping; trial and error was used to find the most effective approach. For camera control and lighting effects, the team drew on its experience developing Virtua Racing. Daytona USA shares some features with Ridge Racer, including a drifting mechanic. Nagoshi initially planned not to include drifting as NASCAR stock cars do not drift, but changed his mind when the team decided not to focus on simulation.

The soundtrack was composed by Takenobu Mitsuyoshi. Mitsuyoshi had no familiarity with stock car racing. He chose to include vocals after hearing Ridge Racer's techno soundtrack and deciding to try a different approach; he recorded his own vocals as the fastest way to get the music into the game. Each course has a corresponding song. "Let's Go Away", the Daytona theme, uses a mixture of rock and funk instrumentals, while "Sky High" leaned on Mitsuyoshi's background in jazz fusion. A hidden track, "Pounding Pavement", was inspired by "Hotel California" by the Eagles. For the arcade version, the songs were sampled onto a Yamaha sound chip, including the drums and Mitsuyoshi's voice, then reconstructed by varying when the tracks would play and loop. Mitsuyoshi said this was the only way to include vocals, due to technical limitations of the Model 2. For the Saturn version, the vocals and instruments were rerecorded with real instruments.

Release

Prior to release, a prototype had debuted at the 1993 Amusement Machine Show in Tokyo, held in August 1993, and it was location tested in Japan the same month. The complete version of Daytona USA was released in Japan in March 1994, and made its North American debut the same month at Chicago's American Coin Machine Exposition (ACME); it was subsequently released worldwide in April 1994. According to Petit, Sega delayed the worldwide launch to measure reception before investing in other territories. The standard game was released in a twin-seat cabinet and a deluxe cabinet fitted with detailed seats on top of subwoofers; Sega originally planned to use actual car seats. Daytona USA debuted at number two on arcade operator publication RePlays "Player's Choice" chart and stayed on the list for five years, with 16 months at number one. Daytona USA was rereleased in 1996 in arcades as Daytona USA: Special Edition, designed as a smaller, more affordable cabinet.

Around the time of the worldwide release, Sega announced releases for its Saturn and 32X consoles. In 1995, Sega announced their intention to focus solely on the Saturn. In early 1995, Sega AM2's Saturn division split into three departments, each charged with converting a different arcade game to the Saturn: Virtua Fighter 2, Virtua Cop, and Daytona USA. Due to slow progress on the Daytona USA conversion, several members of the Virtua Fighter 2 team were reassigned to Daytona USA. AM2 completed the conversion in April 1995. It was a Western launch game for Saturn, and was also released for Windows. In Japan, two separate Windows releases were done in September and December 1996, with the first released version supporting different graphics cards such as Leadtek's WinFast GD400.

Remakes and sequels
Daytona USA: Championship Circuit Edition, a reworked and expanded version of Daytona USA, was released in 1996 for the Saturn. Developed by Sega's consumer software division, it used a modified version of the game engine used for Sega Rally Championship. An enhanced remake, called Sega Racing Classic, was released in 2010 and is the only title in the series not branded with the Daytona name due to no longer having the rights. Another enhanced version was released digitally for the PlayStation 3 and Xbox 360 in 2012, with both the original arcade soundtrack and the newly arranged soundtrack from Sega Racing Classic with vocals by Mitsuyoshi being added in this release, along with added features including eight player online multiplayer, challenge and karaoke modes. The Xbox 360 version was made compatible with Xbox One on March 21, 2017.

Daytona USA 2: Battle on the Edge, an arcade-exclusive sequel using the Sega Model 3 hardware, was released in 1998. It is the only Daytona game that uses no courses or music from the original. Daytona USA 2001, a remake of Daytona USA and Championship Circuit Edition, was released in 2001 for the Dreamcast, with graphical upgrades, online multiplayer, and new courses. Daytona Championship USA, also referred to as Daytona USA 3, debuted in late 2016 as an arcade exclusive; it was the first Daytona arcade game in 18 years.

Reception and legacy

Arcade
Daytona USA was popular in arcades. In Japan, it was the ninth highest-grossing arcade game of 1994, and the highest-grossing dedicated arcade game of 1995. In North America, it was listed by Play Meter as one of the top two highest-grossing arcade video games of 1994, with the twin cabinet receiving a Diamond Award from the American Amusement Machine Association (AAMA) that year; it again received a Diamond Award the following year for being one of America's top three best-selling arcade games of 1995. In the United Kingdom, it topped the dedicated arcade charts for six months in 1994, from May to October. In a 2002 report, Sega said it was one of the most successful arcade games of all time. Retro Gamer's Nick Thorpe said that though Daytona USA is considered anecdotally one of the most successful arcade games for its multiplayer and longevity, exact figures were difficult to find. In 2015, IGN's Luke Reilly said that the game is "perhaps the most recognisable arcade racing game of all time and the highest-grossing sit-down cabinet ever" and noted the continued presence of Daytona USA cabinets in arcades and bowling alleys.

The original arcade game was critically acclaimed. Upon its North American debut at ACME 1994, it received a highly positive reception from Play Meter and RePlay magazines, which both considered it the game of the show while praising the graphics and gameplay, but with Play Meter criticizing the expensive cabinet price. Rik Skews of Computer and Video Games praised its "state-of-the-art" graphics, sound, and damage physics, and said that the gameplay was difficult but "pitched perfect". He called Daytona USA the best arcade game he had played in years. Bob Strauss of Entertainment Weekly gave the game an A and wrote: "Picture yourself watching a sci-fi movie, set in a futuristic arcade, that involves a dizzying car race. 'Wow!' you can imagine saying to yourself, 'How did they do those special effects?' You'll have the same reaction while enjoying Daytona USA". Writing for GamePro, Manny LaMancha commented on the improved graphics and more sensitive steering than Virtua Racing. He stated that Daytona USA is a combination of Virtua Racing's action with Ridge Racer's realism. Electronic Gaming Monthly emphasized the realism graphics and said that "the stakes in the arcade wars have been raised again".

Saturn
The Saturn version received a positive reception, with high scores from most critics, though a number of them criticized it for graphical issues. Two sports reviewers of Electronic Gaming Monthly declared it a good conversion and noted the improvements on the North American version, but found problems with the frame rate and animation. Computer and Video Games considered it better than the PlayStation conversion of Ridge Racer, with Mark Patterson stating that, while "nowhere near as polished as Ridge Racer, it does play better, mainly because you can ram the other cars off the track and smash your own car up." GamePro reviewer Air Hendrix praised the addition of Saturn mode and mirror mode and the gameplay of the core game, but said it "pales in comparison" to the PlayStation version of Ridge Racer in terms of "features, gameplay, and graphics"; the review concluded Daytonas "intense gameplay and breathtaking graphics will exhilarate any racing fan".

Maximum praised the challenging course design and realistic game mechanics, particularly the impact of wind resistance, but criticized the low-resolution texture mapping, clipping, and lack of multiplayer. Sega Saturn Magazine found the game graphically impressive aside from the pop-up and said it had strong arcade-style gameplay. Next Generation wrote that, while "Daytona USA suffers from an accumulation of weaknesses, if it's a fast, thrilling racing game you're after, the Saturn conversion has a great deal to recommend". The Windows version was a port of the Saturn's, and was not as well-received for inheriting the Saturn version's graphical issues despite releasing a year later.

Retrospective
Daytona USA is often considered one of the best games of all time.  It was named as such by Next Generation in 1996, GamesMaster in 1996, Computer and Video Games in 2000, Killer List of Videogames, Yahoo! in 2005, Guinness World Records in 2008, Empire in 2009, NowGamer in 2010, and Electronic Gaming Monthly in 1997, 2001 and 2006. Edge named it the 70th "best game to play today" in 2009. In 2015, IGN named it the sixth most influential racing game, writing that it "remains a shining example of arcade racing done oh so right". Thorpe wrote that Daytona USA "doesn't just stand alongside the likes of Turbo, OutRun, Super Monaco GP and Sega Rally as part of a proud arcade racing heritage, but perhaps defines it".

According to aggregator Metacritic, the Xbox 360 version received "generally favorable reviews" and the PlayStation 3 version received "mixed" reviews. Justin Towell of GamesRadar+ wrote of the rerelease that "Daytona USA is a joyous, jubilant celebration of everything that made arcade games so exciting" and that the new survival mode "a brilliant test of memory, logic and dexterity". Eurogamers Martin Robinson said that "age doesn't seem to have ravaged Daytona USA's core" and noting that it serves as "a fitting epitaph to the genre". 1Up.com's Ray Barnholt praised this version but expressed disappointment at the lack of new features.

See also

Indy 500
NASCAR Arcade

Notes

References

External links 
 
 

1994 video games
Arcade video games
Cancelled Sega 32X games
Daytona USA
Head-to-head arcade video games
Multiplayer and single-player video games
PlayStation Network games
Racing video games
Sega arcade games
Sega Games franchises
Sega Saturn games
Sega video games
Sega-AM2 games
Video games designed by Yu Suzuki
Video games scored by Takenobu Mitsuyoshi
Windows games
Xbox 360 Live Arcade games
Video games developed in Japan